Kim Soo-whan (Hangul: 김수완, Hanja: 金秀完; born 8 June 1988 in Mokpo, Jeollanam-do) is a male South Korean Judoka.

References

External links
 
 Kim Soo-Whan's profile from 2009 Summer Universiade official website

1988 births
Living people
Asian Games medalists in judo
Judoka at the 2010 Asian Games
South Korean male judoka
Asian Games gold medalists for South Korea
Medalists at the 2010 Asian Games
Universiade medalists in judo
Universiade gold medalists for South Korea
Medalists at the 2011 Summer Universiade
Medalists at the 2015 Summer Universiade
People from Mokpo
21st-century South Korean people